Shapkarev Buttress (‘Shapkarev Rid’ \shap-'ka-rev 'rid\) is the rounded, mostly ice-covered buttress extending 13 km in east-west direction and 16 km in north-south direction, rising to 1625 m on the west side of Hemimont Plateau on Fallières Coast in Graham Land, Antarctica. The feature has steep and partly ice-free south, west and north slopes, and surmounts Forbes Glacier to the south, Marvodol Glacier and Kashin Glacier to the west, and Perutz Glacier to the north.

The buttress is named after the Bulgarian folklorist and ethnographer Kuzman Shapkarev (1834–1909).

Location
British mapping in 1978.

Maps
Antarctic Digital Database (ADD). Scale 1:250000 topographic map of Antarctica. Scientific Committee on Antarctic Research (SCAR). Since 1993, regularly upgraded and updated.
British Antarctic Territory. Scale 1:200000 topographic map. DOS 610 Series, Sheet W 67 66. Directorate of Overseas Surveys, Tolworth, UK, 1978.

Notes

References
 Bulgarian Antarctic Gazetteer. Antarctic Place-names Commission. (details in Bulgarian, basic data in English)
 Shapkarev Buttress. SCAR Composite Antarctic Gazetteer

External links
 Shapkarev Buttress. Copernix satellite image

Mountains of Graham Land
Bulgaria and the Antarctic
Fallières Coast